Brown Derby (5 May 1914 – 17 July 2000) was a Scottish film and television actor. He made his film debut as Edith Evans's footman in Thorold Dickinson's classic The Queen of Spades (1949). He played Sergeant Roberts, too, in Suspended Alibi. Derby had a regular role as Scott-Erskine in the BBC's The Omega Factor, and also starred in Dr. Finlay's Casebook, Z-Cars, The Saint, Sutherland's Law, Play for Today, Take The High Road and many other British television shows.

References

External links
 

1914 births
2000 deaths
Scottish male film actors
Scottish male television actors
20th-century Scottish male actors